Mallaig is a hamlet in Alberta, Canada within the County of St. Paul No. 19.

The hamlet was one of the many communities that spawned due to the construction of the railroad in Western Canada during the early 1900s. In 1928, the hamlet was officially founded. The name was inspired by one of the Scottish workers. The many swamps and low-lying areas in the area reminded him of his home town (Mallaig, Scotland).

As the 20th century progressed, the railway has been removed, and has been replaced by the Iron Horse Trail, which is a long, recreational trail intended for all-terrain vehicles. The hamlet today is quite small, containing minimal services, a landfill, and a school (kindergarten to grade 12) with an enrollment of 246 students from the hamlet and surrounding area.

Demographics 

See also 
List of communities in Alberta
List of designated places in Alberta
List of hamlets in Alberta

References

Further reading 
Mallaig – Therien History Book Committee. Precious Memories – Mémoires Précieuses: Mallaig – Therien 1906–1992. Mallaig: Mallaig History Book Committee, 1993.

Hamlets in Alberta
Designated places in Alberta
County of St. Paul No. 19